Karađorđevo can refer to:

 Karađorđevo, Bačka Palanka, a village near Bačka Palanka, Vojvodina, Serbia.
 Karađorđevo hunting ground, a hunting ground, resort and stud farm
 Karađorđevo, Bačka Topola, a village near Bačka Topola, Vojvodina, Serbia.
 Banatsko Karađorđevo, a village near Žitište, Vojvodina, Serbia.